The  Detroit Lions season was their 27th in the league. The team improved on their previous season's output of 3–9, winning nine games. Despite the improvement, they missed the playoffs for the second consecutive season.

Detroit held the top spot by a half game in the Western Conference entering the final game of the season against the Chicago Bears at Wrigley Field, which the Lions lost, 38–21. After completing a handoff early in the second quarter, Detroit quarterback Bobby Layne was concussed and removed from the game, due to an unsportsmanlike conduct foul by Ed Meadows, for which Meadows was ejected.

The following season, the Lions won the Western Conference and the NFL championship, their third of the decade. The Lions won the NFL title in 1952 and 1953, and were runners-up in 1954.

Schedule

Note: Intra-conference opponents are in bold text.

Standings

References 

Detroit Lions seasons
Detroit Lions
Detroit Lions